A Polar diagram could refer to:

 Polar area diagram, a type of pie chart
 Radiation pattern, in antenna theory
 Spherical coordinate system, the three-dimensional form of a polar response curve
 In sailing, a Polar diagram is a graph that shows a sailing boats potential wind speed over a range of wind and sail angles.

 graph which contrasts the sink rate of an aircraft with its horizontal speed (polar curve).